Alin Roman (born 27 January 1994) is a Romanian professional footballer who plays for Liga II club Politehnica Iași. He has previously played in Liga I for Dinamo București and ACS Poli Timișoara.

References

External links
 
 

1994 births
Living people
FC Dinamo București players
ACS Poli Timișoara players
CS Sportul Snagov players
FC UTA Arad players
SK Vorwärts Steyr players
FC Politehnica Iași (2010) players
Romanian footballers
Romanian expatriate footballers
Liga I players
Liga II players
Association football forwards
Expatriate footballers in Austria
Sportspeople from Timișoara